It or IT may refer to:
 It (pronoun), in English
 Information technology

Arts and media

Film and television
 It (1927 film), a film starring Clara Bow
 It! The Terror from Beyond Space, a 1958 science fiction film
 It! (1967 film), a film starring Roddy McDowell
 It (1989 film), a Soviet comedy film directed by Sergei Ovcharov
 It (miniseries), a 1990 television miniseries film based on Stephen King's novel
 It (Phish video), a 2004 DVD set about the Phish festival
 Incredible Tales, simply known as I.T., a 2004 Singaporean horror anthology TV series
 I.T. (film), a 2016 film starring Pierce Brosnan
 It (2017 film), a film adaptation of Stephen King's novel
It Chapter Two (2019), the direct sequel to the 2017 film

Characters
 It, properly the Psammead, the title character of the 1902 novel Five Children and It
 It! The Living Colossus, a 1961 comic book character
 IT, a character in the 1962 novel A Wrinkle in Time
 It (character), the title character from Stephen King's 1986 novel It (also known as Pennywise)

Journalism
 IT, previous name of the Irish Tatler, see Tatler (1901)
 International Times, est. 1966, a fortnightly newspaper
 Illinois Times, est. 1975, a weekly newspaper

Literature
 "It!" (short story), a 1940 short story by Theodore Sturgeon
 It (poetry collection), a 1969 book of poetry by Inger Christensen
 It (novel), a 1986 novel by Stephen King
 It, a 2013 book by British model and presenter Alexa Chung

Music
 It (Phish festival), since 1990, the band's festivals and tours in the United States
 "IT" (XM), from 2002 to 2007, an annual radio special, with most songs aired in chronological order

Album
 It (Pulp album), 1983
 It (Alan Vega album), 2017

Band
 Tony Särkkä or It, a Swedish black metal musician

Song
 "It", a 1974 song by Genesis from The Lamb Lies Down on Broadway
 "It", a 1987 song by Prince from Sign "O" the Times
 "iT" (sic), a 2014 song by Christine and the Queens from Chaleur humaine
 "It", a 2015 song by Niki & Gabi

Games
 Tag (game), or It, since at least the fourth century BC
 It (board game), a 1978 tank battle game

Science and technology

 .it, the Internet top-level domain for Italy
 Inferior temporal gyrus, a.k.a. IT cortex, a region of the brain
 IT (file format), an audio file format used by Impulse Tracker
 IT, an electrical network earthing system
 Information technology
 Integration testing (usually I&T), a phase in software testing
 Isomeric transition, a decay process in an atomic nucleus
 it drive (1998–2002), a 144 MB superfloppy drive by Caleb

Standards
 Iran Time
 Italy (ISO 3166 code)
 Italian language (ISO 639-1 code)

Transport
 Air Inter (IATA Code 1954–1997), France
 Kingfisher Airlines (IATA Code 2003–2012), India
 Intelligent Transit, a 2009–2015 bus service in West Virginia, U.S.

Vehicles
 As of the 1970s, a series of Yamaha Enduro motorcycles
 Dynasty IT, a 2001 car

Other uses
 IT, dated between the 6th and 4th century BCE, in sutras by Pāṇini
 It, a ropes course at several locations of Jordan's Furniture, founded 1918 in New England
 I.T, founded 1988, a Hong Kong fashion conglomerate

See also
 It girl, a charismatic young woman
 Cousin Itt, character in The Addams Family
 Getting It: The Psychology of est